Weak approximation may refer to:

 Weak approximation theorem, an extension of the Chinese remainder theorem to algebraic groups over global fields
 Weak weak approximation, a form of weak approximation for varieties
 Weak-field approximation, a solution in general relativity